Enchiridion is a small manual or handbook.

It can refer more specifically to:
 Enchiridion of Epictetus, a short manual of Stoic ethical advice
 The Enchiridion de metris of Hephaestion, an ancient treatise on poetic meters
 Enchiridion of Sextus Pomponius, a 2nd-century collection of Roman law
 Enchiridion on Faith, Hope and Love by Augustine of Hippo, a compact treatise on Christian piety (420)
 Enchiridion of Byrhtferth (c. 970 – c. 1020)
 The Enchiridion militis Christiani of Erasmus (1501)
 Erfurt Enchiridion, an early Lutheran hymnal (1524)
 Enchiridion (Dirk Philips), (1564)
 Enchiridion symbolorum, definitionum et declarationum de rebus fidei et morum, an 1854 compendium of basic texts of Catholic dogma and morality
 Enchiridion Indulgentiarum, a Catholic manual of indulgences

See also
 "The Enchiridion!" (2010), fifth episode of the first season of the animated television series Adventure Time
 Encheiridion, an orchid